Belmond Copacabana Palace, better known as simply Copacabana Palace, is a hotel in the city of Rio de Janeiro, Brazil, facing Copacabana beach. Designed by French architect Joseph Gire, it was built in a style that follows the line and model of the great beach hotels of the nineteenth and early twentieth centuries, and opened on August 13, 1923.

With almost a century of existence, Belmond Copacabana Palace continues to be one of the most important hotel complexes in the city of Rio, and in Brazil, with two hundred and forty-three rooms (116 apartments and 127 suites), divided between the main and the annex building, in an area of twelve thousand square meters.

Belmond Copacabana Palace is known throughout Brazil for the international celebrities who stay at the hotel when visiting the city of Rio de Janeiro. Some famous guests include Walt Disney, Marlene Dietrich, Ginger Rogers, Brigitte Bardot, Jayne Mansfield, Paul McCartney, Janis Joplin, Madonna, Mick Jagger, Princess Diana, Carla Bruni, Halle Barry, Justin Bieber, Miley Cyrus,  J. Rubinetti and others. In addition, the hotel is also known for hosting some of the most popular social events in the country.

The hotel has been voted several times as the best hotel in South America, including in 2009, when it won the World Travel Award, one of the most important tourism awards in the world.

History

Belmond Copacabana Palace was built by businessman Octavio Guinle and Francisco Castro Silva between 1919 and 1923, in an initiative of President Epitacio Pessoa (1919-1922), who wanted a large tourism hotel in the then capital of the country, to help host the great number of visitors expected for the big Centennial of the Independence of Brazil Exhibition, an event of international dimensions to be held on the esplanade of Castelo, a region in downtown Rio de Janeiro, in 1922. In return, the Federal Government would grant tax incentives, as well as the license to have a casino work in it - a requirement of the entrepreneur.

Once the agreement was done, the businessman acquired a plot of land on Copacabana beach, facing Avenida Atlântica, which was extended in 1919 by engineer Paulo de Frontin. At the time, the hotel was the first large building in Copacabana, and was surrounded only by small houses and mansions.

French architect Joseph Gire was hired to carry out the project, drawing inspiration from two famous hotels on the French Riviera: the Negresco, in Nice, and the Carlton, in Cannes. The structure, sober and imposing, was erected by engineer César Melo e Cunha, who employed, on a large scale, Carrara marble and Bohemia crystals.

However, the hotel was only inaugurated on August 13, 1923, almost a year after the Centennial Exposition. This was due to the difficulties in the importation of marbles and crystals and in the execution of its foundations (with a fourteen-meter depth, as required by the project); to the lack of technology and experience in the country for such manufacturing; and a violent undertow that, in 1922, destroyed Avenida Atlântica, causing damage to the hotel's lower floors.

To mark the inauguration, the great French singer, actress and vedette Mistinguett was invited to the ceremony, and, despite having the famous "most beautiful legs in the world", was prohibited from showing them at the party. Her presence and presentation made the hotel's inauguration an event of world proportions.

In view of the delay in the execution of the project, President Artur Bernardes (1922-1926) tried to revoke the license to operate the casino in 1924. The matter was referred to Court, and the Guinle family, after ten years of dispute, won the case. The hotel and its casino were essential for the consolidation of the fame and glamour of the neighborhood in the following decades.

On May 23, 1928, President Washington Luis (1926-1930) was shot at the hotel by his mistress, the Italian marquess Elvira Vishi Maurich, who was 28 years old at the time. President Washington Luis was then hospitalized, with the official statement affirming he had had an appendicitis crisis. Four days later the young marquess was found dead. The police report stated it to be a suicide.

In 1934, the hotel's swimming pool was built, and, in 1949, it was extended, with a project by engineer César Melo e Cunha. In 1938, the "Golden Room" was inaugurated, with a show by French actor, cabaret singer and entertainer Maurice Chevalier.

In April 1946, after World War II, President Eurico Gaspar Dutra (1946-1951) banned gambling in the country. The casino was then transformed into a concert hall, and the hotel underwent a major renovation, increasing its capacity and adding two areas to the main building: the side pergola and the back annex (opened in 1949). This remodeling was in charge of architect Wladimir Alves de Sousa.

With the capital of Brazil being transferred to Brasilia in 1960, the hotel experienced a period of slow decay, until it was overcome by more modern hotels, built in the 1970s.

In 1985, its demolition was projected. However, Copacabana Palace became a cultural property, being registered in federal (IPHAN), state (INEPAC) and municipal (SEDREPAHC) levels. In 1989, the Guinle family, represented by José Eduardo Guinle, sold it to the then Orient Express group, now called Belmond, which rehabilitated the Copacabana Palace, modernizing the old facilities without discharacterizing them.

References

External links 
Official website

Belmond hotels
Hotels in Rio de Janeiro (city)
Hotels established in 1923
Hotel buildings completed in 1923
1923 establishments in Brazil